Federal Route 141 (formerly Melaka state route M23) is a federal road in Melaka, Malaysia. The Kilometre Zero of the Federal Route 141 starts at Tanjung Kling.

Features

At most sections, the Federal Route 141 was built under the JKR R5 road standard, allowing maximum speed limit of up to 90 km/h.

List of junctions

References

140